Großbadegast is a village and a former municipality in the district of Anhalt-Bitterfeld, in Saxony-Anhalt, Germany. Since 1 January 2010, it is part of the town Südliches Anhalt.

People 
 Franz Krüger (1797–1857), prussian painter
 Otto Theodor von Seydewitz (1818–1898), prussian politician

Former municipalities in Saxony-Anhalt
Südliches Anhalt